Martina Ratej (born 2 November 1981) is a Slovenian track and field athlete who competes in the javelin throw.

Career
Ratej competed at the 2006 European Championships and the 2008 Olympic Games without reaching the final.

Ratej won the bronze medal at the 2009 Mediterranean Games, finished eleventh at the 2009 World Championships and eighth at the 2009 World Athletics Final. These results represented a breakthrough for the athlete, who had previously struggled to make an impact at major competitions.

Ratej broke the Slovenian record at the 2010 European Cup Winter Throwing, winning the gold with a throw of 65.96 m. As a result, she was runner-up in the European Athletics athlete of the month competition.

In 2012, she competed at the Olympic Games in London where she reached the final and finished seventh.

Doping disqualification
Martina Ratej was definitively suspended for doping on 10 March 2020 because she was found positive at the London 2012 Olympics.

Achievements

References

External links
 

1981 births
Living people
Slovenian female javelin throwers
Athletes (track and field) at the 2008 Summer Olympics
Athletes (track and field) at the 2012 Summer Olympics
Athletes (track and field) at the 2016 Summer Olympics
Olympic athletes of Slovenia
World Athletics Championships athletes for Slovenia
Mediterranean Games gold medalists for Slovenia
Mediterranean Games bronze medalists for Slovenia
Mediterranean Games medalists in athletics
Athletes (track and field) at the 2009 Mediterranean Games
Athletes (track and field) at the 2013 Mediterranean Games
Doping cases in athletics
Slovenian sportspeople in doping cases